The Bắc Khê  is a left tributary of the Kỳ Cùng River. It is 54 km long with a catchment area of 801 km2 and flows through Tràng Định District in Lạng Sơn Province  in northeastern Vietnam. The river flows in a northeasterly-north direction and ends near the border with Cao Bằng Province.

External links
Map of northeastern Vietnam showing rivers

Rivers of Lạng Sơn province
Rivers of Vietnam